Robert Edward "Bob" Montgomery (born April 16, 1944) is an American former professional baseball player and television sports commentator. Nicknamed "Monty", he played his entire career in Major League Baseball (MLB) as a catcher, and also played six games at first base, for the Boston Red Sox from 1970 to 1979. He batted and threw right-handed.

Montgomery signed for the Boston Red Sox as an amateur free agent in 1962 and played for seven of their minor league affiliates until 1970, when the Red Sox promoted him to the major leagues.  There, he served as the team's backup catcher behind future Hall of Fame member Carlton Fisk.  He spent the next nine years with the Red Sox and played his last game on September 9, 1979.  Montgomery is most famous for being the last major league player to bat without wearing a helmet.

Personal life
Montgomery was born on April 16, 1944, in Nashville, Tennessee.  Baseball played a huge role in his family; his father frequently took part in sandlot ball, while his brother Gerald played for several minor league affiliates of the Boston Red Sox.  Montgomery attended Nashville's Central High School. Although he actively participated in three sports, he was most inclined to baseball, playing in the outfield, at first base and pitching.

Upon his graduation from high school. Montgomery was signed by George J. Digby, a renowned scout who worked for the Boston Red Sox organization.

Professional career

Minor leagues
Montgomery began his professional baseball career for the Olean Red Sox, a minor league baseball team that were members of the New York–Penn League.  Playing both third base and the outfield, he batted .273, enough to earn him a promotion to the Class-A Waterloo Hawks of the Midwest League in the following season.  It was here that Montgomery was encouraged by manager Len Okrie to switch positions to catcher, in order to improve his chances of being promoted into the major leagues.

Boston Red Sox (1970–1979)
In , Major League Baseball made it compulsory for all players to wear batting helmets, although active players like Montgomery were allowed to continue batting without one per a grandfather clause.  Montgomery opted to utilize this privilege, choosing to strengthen the inside of his cap with protective lining instead.  Consequently, Montgomery was the last major league player to bat without wearing a helmet when he played his final game on September 9, 1979.

In 387 career games, he compiled a .258 batting average with 23 home runs and 156 runs batted in.

Post-playing career
After his playing career, Montgomery spent fourteen seasons (1982–1995) as the color commentator for Red Sox telecasts on WSBK-TV and NESN (1985–1987). Montgomery now owns and operates Big League Promotions which manufactures game boards using professional sports licensing.
He has also served as a color analyst for telecasts of the minor-league Pawtucket Red Sox and Portland Sea Dogs on NESN and Cox Sports.

See also
List of Major League Baseball players who spent their entire career with one franchise

References

External links

BaseballLibrary.com - biography
Baseball Almanac
Big League Promotions

1944 births
Living people
Baseball players from Nashville, Tennessee
Boston Red Sox announcers
Boston Red Sox players
Major League Baseball catchers
Major League Baseball broadcasters
Olean Red Sox players
People from Saugus, Massachusetts
Sportspeople from Essex County, Massachusetts